"Enzo" is a song by French producer DJ Snake and American rapper Sheck Wes featuring Atlanta-based rapper 21 Savage and fellow American rappers Offset and Gucci Mane. It was released as a single on April 24, 2019, from Snake's second studio album Carte Blanche (2019),

Promotion
DJ Snake shared the cover art on Twitter on April 23, 2019, and said the track would be released the next day.

Charts

Release history

References

2019 singles
2019 songs
DJ Snake songs
Gucci Mane songs
Offset (rapper) songs
Sheck Wes songs
21 Savage songs
Songs written by DJ Snake
Songs written by Gucci Mane
Songs written by Offset (rapper)
Songs written by 21 Savage

Interscope Records singles